Hashiratani (written: 柱谷) is a Japanese surname. Notable people with the surname include:

, Japanese footballer and manager
, Japanese footballer and manager

Japanese-language surnames